Devudu Chesina Manushulu is the feature film soundtrack of the 2012 comedy film of the same name directed by Puri Jagannadh starring Ravi Teja and Ileana D'Cruz in the lead roles. The film's soundtrack and background score were composed by Raghu Kunche with Bhaskarabhatla Ravikumar penning all the lyrics. The audio of the film was released on 22 June 2012 through Sony Music label in market and launch of the audio was held at a private auditorium in Hyderabad on same day. The audio was a Huge Hit with positive response from critics and audience.

Track list
The Track list consists of 6 songs all composed by Raghu Kunche and all written by Bhaskarabhatla Ravi Kumar with Raghu Kunche singing 2 of the songs and Shreya Ghoshal, Suchitra, Udit Narayan, Chinmayi, Adnan Sami, Joanna and Anjana Soumya crooning the rest.

Reception
The audio received positive reviews. Sirish A. of Musicperk.com gave a review terming the album "An album with high dose of mass appeal" and rating it 6.5/10 picking 'Subba Lakshmi' and 'Nuvvele Nuvvele' as the picks of the Album. Mahesh S Koneru of 123telugu.com gave a review stating "The audio album of 'Devudu Chesina Manushulu' has 'mass masala entertainer' written all over it. The album has four sure shot winners – 'Subba Lakshmi', 'Nuvvele Nuvvele', 'Disturb Chesthannade' and 'Nuvvante Chala' are my picks and they have been composed very entertainingly by Raghu Kunche. These songs will strike a chord with movie lovers across all segments." IndiaGlitz gave a review stating "Without going for pretensions, Raghu Kunche here delivers a modest album that works for the atmospherics of Devudu Chesina Manushulu.  Raghu Kunche, Shreya Ghoshal, Suchitra, Udit Narayan, Adnan Sami, Chinmayi, Joanna chip in with a range of soothing voices."  Cinecorn.com rated the album 3.25/5 and called the Album "Intermittently appealing".

References

External links
Devudu Chesina Manushulu at Gaana
Devudu Chesina Manushulu at iTunes

2012 soundtrack albums
Telugu film soundtracks
Sony Music India soundtracks